The Queens Community Board 10 is a local government in the New York City borough of Queens, encompassing the neighborhoods of Howard Beach, Ozone Park, South Ozone Park, Richmond Hill, Tudor Village and Lindenwood. It is delimited by the Brooklyn border to the west, Liberty Avenue and 103rd Avenue to the north, Van Wyck Expressway to the east and Jamaica Bay and John F. Kennedy International Airport to the south.

Queens Community Board 10 is located at  115-01 Lefferts Boulevard, South Ozone Park, New York, 11417.

References

External links
Profile of the Community Board

Community boards of Queens